The Founders League is an American athletic league comprising a number of college preparatory schools. Founded in 1984, it consists of ten schools in Connecticut and one from eastern New York. All of the schools in the Conference are founding members. The League is one of eleven in the New England Preparatory School Athletic Council.

Members

Competition 
Founders League competition takes place in the following sports: baseball, basketball, cross country, field hockey, football, golf, ice hockey, lacrosse, soccer, softball, squash, swimming, tennis, track and field, volleyball, and wrestling. By and large, member schools compete for the Founders League Championship in each of the aforementioned sports for which a team is fielded. In some cases, Founders League teams collectively participate in regional leagues or tournaments, including the New Englands. The Founders League is recognized by the New England Preparatory School Athletic Council.

References

External links 
http://www.thefoundersleague.org

High school sports associations in the United States